Broadway the Hard Way  is a live album by American musician Frank Zappa recorded at various performances along his 1988 world tour.  It was first released as a 9-track vinyl album through Zappa's label Barking Pumpkin Records in October 1988, and subsequently as a 17-track CD through Rykodisc in 1989.

Music and lyrics
This album was compiled from Zappa's last tour in 1988. Most of the songs are satirical of prominent contemporary figures, chiefly in the political sphere, and of current social and political trends. Zappa's individual targets include Richard Nixon and Ronald Reagan on "Dickie's Such an Asshole" (written in 1973), Jesse Jackson on "Rhymin' Man", Jim and Tammy Faye Bakker and Pat Robertson on "Jesus Thinks You're a Jerk", and Michael Jackson and his family on "Why Don't You Like Me?".  In "Any Kind of Pain" (which Zappa's band had performed as an instrumental in 1976 and rehearsed in 1981, with slightly different melody and lyrics, but was not completed as a vocal work until 1988), he satirises the manner in which an imagined vapid model is exploited and despised by the men who employ her.

The album contains several covers, from the jazz standard "Stolen Moments" to the Police song "Murder by Numbers" (with a guest appearance by Sting). "Outside Now" is from Joe's Garage, and "Why Don't You Like Me" can be easily recognized as a remake of Zappa's 1970 title "Tell Me You Love Me." "Rhymin' Man" is filled with melodic quotes from evergreens such as "Happy Days Are Here Again", "Hava Nagila", "La Cucaracha" and "Frère Jacques". In "What Kind of Girl" there is a line from "Strawberry Fields Forever" and a segment from the "Battle Hymn of the Republic"; while "Jesus Thinks You're a Jerk" quotes "Louie Louie", "Rock of Ages" and Marius Constant's Theme from The Twilight Zone.

"Promiscuous", which takes aim at surgeon general C. Everett Koop, is delivered in rapped verse.

Despite the title, Zappa did not intend the material for a theatrical production, but the album received a Grammy nomination in 1990 for Best Musical Cast Show Album, losing to Jerome Robbins' Broadway.

Track listing 
All tracks by Frank Zappa, except where noted.

Original LP

Personnel 

 Frank Zappa – lead guitar, vocal
 Ike Willis – guitar, vocal
 Mike Keneally – guitar, synth, vocal
 Robert Martin – keyboards, vocal
 Ed Mann – percussion
 Walt Fowler – trumpet
 Bruce Fowler – trombone
 Paul Carman – alto saxophone
 Albert Wing – tenor saxophone
 Kurt McGettrick – baritone saxophone
 Scott Thunes – bass
 Chad Wackerman – drums
 Eric Buxton (an audience member) – spoken narrative during middle 8 on "Jesus Thinks You're A Jerk"
 Sting – lead vocal on "Murder by Numbers"

References

External links 
 Release details

1989 live albums
Barking Pumpkin Records albums
Frank Zappa live albums
Cultural depictions of Ronald Reagan
Cultural depictions of Richard Nixon
Cultural depictions of Michael Jackson
Cultural depictions of Elvis Presley